A by-election was held in the New South Wales state electoral district of Rous on 11 February 1905. The by-election was triggered by the death  of John Coleman.

Dates

Result

John Coleman died.

See also
Electoral results for the district of Rous
List of New South Wales state by-elections

Notes

References

New South Wales state by-elections
1905 elections in Australia
1900s in New South Wales